Pastoriza is a surname. Notable people with the name include:

Agustín Pastoriza (born 1966) Argentine footballer
Benita Martínez Pastoriza (1819–1890), First Lady of Argentina
Benito Pastoriza Iyodo (born 1954), Puerto Rican author
Fernando Pastoriza (born 1965), Argentine athlete
José Omar Pastoriza (1942–2004), Argentine footballer
Joseph Jay Pastoriza (1857–1917), American businessman and Mayor of Houston, Texas
Juan Manuel Pastoriza (died 1896), Cuban baseball player
Miriani Griselda Pastoriza (born 1939), Argentine-born Brazilian astronomer

See also
A Pastoriza, a municipality in the Spanish province of Lugo